Adam McCright Nelson (born July 7, 1975) is an American shot putter and Olympic gold medalist. Nelson competed in three consecutive Olympic Games in 2000, 2004 and 2008. In addition to his gold medal at the 2004 Olympics, Nelson won a silver medal at the 2000 Olympics.

He is married to Laci Nelson and he has 2 daughters, Caroline and Lauren Nelson.

Personal life
Adam Nelson was born in Atlanta, Georgia. He attended The Lovett School in Atlanta where he was a letterman and a standout in football and track and field. Nelson graduated from Lovett in 1993 and moved on to Dartmouth College, graduating from the Ivy League school in 1997.

In addition to shot put, Nelson played football at Dartmouth, as a linebacker and later, as a defensive tackle. In 1993 he became the first freshman ever to play football on the Dartmouth squad. Prior to 1993, the Ivy League prohibited first-year students from playing on the varsity football team. Nelson was a member of Dartmouth's 1996 undefeated Ivy League champion team.

At Dartmouth, Adam Nelson served as President of Chi Heorot fraternity.

Prior to his own Olympics experience, Nelson worked at a concession stand during the 1996 Summer Olympics in his hometown of Atlanta.

International career
Adam Nelson earned a silver medal In the 2000 Summer Olympics in Sydney, Australia, Prior to the Games, Nelson was considered the favorite to win gold. He had won the title in every major shot put event leading up to the Olympic Games that summer including the 2000 Olympic Trials.

At that time, this was the third-longest throw in U.S. history and the ninth-farthest ever in the world.

At the 2004 Summer Olympics in Athens, Greece the shot put was held in a spectacular setting at the original Stadium of Ancient Olympia, bringing Olympic competition back to the venue for the first time in over a millennium.

He held the lead going into the final round, despite fouling throws in rounds 2, 3, 4 and 5. As the event leader, Nelson was the last to throw in the sixth and final round. Nelson entered the ring for his final throw to break the tie. He unleashed what looked to be initially a gold medal-winning 70-foot throw, but Nelson was flagged for stepping on the line to the left-front of the circle. Nelson protested vociferously to the officials at the time of the call, but later apologized for his emotional reaction.

With Nelson and Bilonog precisely tied on distance after six-rounds, the tie-breaker rule came into effect, counting the competitors' second-best throws. Because Nelson had fouled on each throw after the opening round, he had no second mark. Yuriy Bilonog was awarded the gold medal; Nelson was awarded his second consecutive Olympic silver medal. Nelson's shot put Silver was the first track and field medal for the United States in the 2004 Summer Olympics.

Nelson's silver medal in the shot put at the 2004 Summer Olympics was upgraded to a gold medal retroactively in 2013 after Yuriy Bilonog's urine sample tested positive for performance-enhancing drug use. With the advent of drug testing at international athletic competitions, it has become increasingly common for athlete disqualifications from placements in standings months or years after the event conclusions.

At the 2008 Summer Olympics in Beijing, Nelson failed to throw a valid mark in the final. At the 2009 and 2011 World Athletics Championships, Nelson failed to medal in the finals, finishing 5th and 8th place, respectively.

Nelson attempted to make the U.S. Olympic Team for a fourth time at the 2012 United States Olympic Trials, but did not make the final round in wet conditions.

2013 elevation to Olympic gold medal
In 2012, retroactive testing on competitors' urine samples retained from the 2004 Olympic Games by the International Olympic Committee revealed that 2004 Olympic gold medalist Yuriy Bilonog of Ukraine was guilty of performance-enhancing drug use. In 2012, the IOC re-tested approximately 100 urine samples from specific events in the 2004 Games and found that four medal winners in Track and Field (both men and women, all in the throwing events) tested positive for performance-enhancing drugs.

On December 5, 2012, the IOC announced that men's shot put winner Bilonog, and women's shot put third-place finisher, Svetlana Krivelyova of Russia, re-tests showed positive for the steroid agent, Oxandrolone. Bilonog was stripped of his gold medal. The IOC, following established rules, allowed Bilonog (and the others disqualified) 21 days to appeal the ruling. Although no appeal was filed, the IOC waited another five months, to May 30, 2013, before declaring Adam Nelson the 2004 Olympic champion and awarding him the gold medal.

Nelson received his gold medal from a United States Olympic Committee official at an airport food court in Atlanta.

In 2017, Adam Nelson joined Michael Phelps in speaking before a U.S. Congressional committee examining anti-doping measures in international sporting events.

Spin technique
Nelson throws with his right arm, utilizing the "spin" technique to generate speed and power within the 7-foot-diameter (2.135-meter) throwing ring. While the "spin" is considered a more powerful style (because of its rotational speed), competitors have a greater tendency to foul compared to those who use the more traditional "glide" technique. Although throws are usually launched within the legal sector, spinners are more prone to lose their balance in their follow-through and to step on the front toe board (or, to have a foot come down to the side, on or over the ring's 7-foot circle line.) For example, at the 2004 Olympic Games, Nelson foot-fouled on five of his six rounds of throws, though he did still win the gold medal.

Advertising
During the early 2005 shot put season, Nelson solicited sponsors by wearing T-shirts reading "Space for Rent."  This culminated in May when Nelson found a sponsor in the amount of $12,000, slightly more than the donation Nelson had made to the World Anti-Doping Agency following his second Olympic silver medal, and prior to that Olympics' winner later being disqualified for positive drug test. Nelson went on to win the IAAF World Championships later that season (though he wore the USA uniform in that competition).

Post-shot put career
Since retiring from formal athletic competition, Nelson has trained top-level athletes in football, golf, baseball, and track and field. He has worked for NBC Sports as an expert on field events. Nelson remains a strong advocate of clean sport competition and often speaks out against the use of performance-enhancing drugs in athletic competition.

In 2017, Nelson moved to Houston with his wife and two kids, where he works for The D10, an events organization, that like the Olympic movement, has found ways to leverage physical performance to create a massive social impact, raising over $12 million for pediatric cancer research and treatment.

In 2020, he returned to his alma mater to become the athletic director of The Lovett School.

Major competition record

References

External links
 
 
 
 
 
 

1975 births
Living people
American male shot putters
Athletes (track and field) at the 2000 Summer Olympics
Athletes (track and field) at the 2004 Summer Olympics
Athletes (track and field) at the 2008 Summer Olympics
Dartmouth Big Green football players
Olympic gold medalists for the United States in track and field
Olympic silver medalists for the United States in track and field
World Athletics Championships medalists
Medalists at the 2004 Summer Olympics
Medalists at the 2000 Summer Olympics
Universiade medalists in athletics (track and field)
Goodwill Games medalists in athletics
The Lovett School alumni
Track and field athletes from Atlanta
Universiade silver medalists for the United States
USA Outdoor Track and Field Championships winners
World Athletics Championships winners
Medalists at the 1999 Summer Universiade
Competitors at the 1998 Goodwill Games
Competitors at the 2001 Goodwill Games
Goodwill Games gold medalists in athletics